Swimming at the 2016 Paralympic Games was held from 8 to 17 September 2016 at Rio Olympic Aquatics Stadium. The competition consisted of 152 events, across multiple classifications, and all swum in a long course (50-metre) pool. Up to 600 swimmers (340 males, 260 females) competed in the Games. With 152 events, swimming came second only to athletics as the largest sport at the 2016 Games.

Qualification

Events

152 events over two genders (with one mixed relay), across 14 classification and four strokes were contested during the Games. Below is a summary of the events that were contested at the 2016 Games :

Key:

 ID : Intellectual impairments
 S : Freestyle, butterfly and backstroke classification - 
 SB : breaststroke classification - 
 SM : Medley classification
 ● : men's event in this classification - 
 o : women's event in this classification
 ●●●● : men's relay event across these classifications - 
 oooo : women's relay event across these classifications
 ●o●o : mixed relay event across these classifications

Event schedule

The schedule for the swimming events in the 2016 Summer Paralympics is reproduced below; in all cases, heats in each event were held in the morning, and the finals and victory ceremonies of the events were held on the evenings of the same day

Medal table

Medalists

Multiple medalists

Men's events

Women's events

Mixed events

References

 
2016 Summer Paralympics events
Paralympics
2016
Swimming competitions in Brazil